Four by the Beatles is an EP of music by English rock band the Beatles. Released on 11 May 1964, it is the second of three Beatles EPs released in the United States and the first of two by Capitol Records. The EP features four songs that had previously been heavily imported into the US as Canadian singles. It managed to peak at No. 92 on the US Billboard Hot 100 singles chart.

Track listing

Chart performance

Notes

External links
The Beatles Discography 1962–1970: American EPs page
Bruce Spizer's The Beatles' Story on Capitol Records, Part One: Beatlemania and the Singles website

1964 EPs
Albums produced by George Martin
The Beatles EPs
Capitol Records EPs